The 66th Corps was a corps formation of the German Army in World War I.  It was formed on 9 May 1917 and was still in existence at the end of the war.

Chronicle 
The 66th Corps (z.b.V.) was formed on 9 May 1917.  It was formerly known as Gruppe "Nowogrodek", named for the city of Nowogrodek. (Now known as Navahrudak.)

With the onset of trench warfare, the German Army recognised that it was no longer possible to maintain the traditional Corps unit, that is, one made up of two divisions.  Whereas at some times (and in some places) a Corps of two divisions was sufficient, at other times 5 or 6 divisions were necessary.  Therefore, under the Hindenburg regime (from summer 1916), new Corps headquarters were created without organic divisions.  These new Corps were designated
General Commands for Special Use.

By the end of the war, the Corps was serving on the Western Front as part of 19th Army, Heeresgruppe Herzog Albrecht von Württemberg with the following composition:
 2nd Bavarian Landwehr Division
 19th Ersatz Division
 17th Reserve Division

Commanders 
The 66th Corps had the following commanders during its existence:

Glossary 
Armee-Abteilung or Army Detachment in the sense of "something detached from an Army".  It is not under the command of an Army so is in itself a small Army.
Armee-Gruppe or Army Group in the sense of a group within an Army and under its command, generally formed as a temporary measure for a specific task.
Heeresgruppe or Army Group in the sense of a number of armies under a single commander.

See also 

German Army (German Empire)
German Army order of battle, Western Front (1918)

References

Bibliography 
 
 

Corps of Germany in World War I
Military units and formations established in 1917
Military units and formations disestablished in 1919